Joosep Matjus (born 14 June 1984, Elva) is an Estonian film director, cinematographer and scenarist. Matjus is most widely known as a documentary filmmaker.

He is studied at Baltic Film and Media School.

Selected filmography

 2021 Pingeväljade aednik (documentary film; director, producer, operator)
 2020 Fred Jüssi. Olemise ilu (documentary film; operator)
 2018 Tuulte tahutud maa (documentary film; director, scenarist, operator)
 2014 Kajaka teoreem (documentary film; director, scenarist, operator)
 2009 Vanamees ja põder  (documentary film; director, scenarist, operator)

References

Living people
1984 births
Estonian film directors
Estonian screenwriters
Estonian cinematographers
Tallinn University alumni
People from Elva, Estonia